Columbus City Schools, formerly known as Columbus Public Schools, is the official school district for the city of Columbus, Ohio, and serves most of the city (portions of the city are served by suburban school districts).  The district has  46,686 students enrolled, making it the largest school district in the state of Ohio as of June 2021. At its peak during the 1971 school year the district served 110,725 students.

The first school built in the area which is now part of Columbus was a log cabin school-house built in Franklinton, in 1806.  It was not until 1845 that the state of Ohio Legislature entrusted the management of Columbus schools to a Board of Education.  Two years later the school board elected Dr. Asa Lord as the district's first superintendent.  Dr. Gene T. Harris  served as the 19th superintendent of Columbus City Schools and was succeeded by Dr. Dan Good. For most of its history, the district has been referred to as "Columbus Public Schools". In August 2007, the district decided to begin using its official name of "Columbus City Schools."

1977 desegregation
Although technically the landmark Brown v. Board of Education case made segregation in schools illegal, some schools were still segregated by the neighborhoods they served. In March 1977 Federal District Court Judge Robert M. Duncan ruled in Penick v. Columbus Board of Education that the school boundary methods used by Columbus Public Schools promoted segregation by sending black students to predominantly black schools and white students to predominantly white schools. The result was desegregation busing to desegregate all schools in the Columbus Public School district.

Before the 1978-1979 school year the Columbus Public School district petitioned Supreme Court Justice William Rehnquist for a stay on the forced busing, and the petition was granted. However, in April 1979 the Supreme Court made their decision and upheld the original Duncan decision.

Before this landmark decision was handed down, the district had a peak of 110,725 students enrolled in 1971 and operated 20 high schools. Many parents moved their children out of the Columbus district to the suburbs to avoid the desegregation. As a result, district enrollment significantly declined, forcing two high schools, Central High School (In 1982) and North High School (In 1979) to be closed, as well as several elementary and middle schools.

School enrollment

Enrollment figures in the school district have significantly increased in the past and recently decreased. Following is a list of school enrollments over the years.

Board of education
There are seven members on the Board of Education. Current members are listed below:
Jennifer A. Adair, President
Ramona R. Reyes, Vice-President 
Carol Beckerle
Eric S. Brown
Michael Cole
Dr. Tina Pierce
James Ragland

Schools
There are approximately 118 active schools in the district. Schools include:

Elementary schools

Alexander Graham Bell Elementary School
Alpine Elementary School
Avalon Elementary School
Avondale Elementary School
Beatty Park Elementary School
Berwick Alternative Elementary School
Binns Elementary School
Broadleigh Elementary School
Burroughs Elementary School
Cassady Alternative Elementary School
Cedarwood Alternative Elementary School

Clinton Elementary School
Colerain Elementary School
Columbus Spanish Immersion Academy
Como Elementary School
Cranbrook Elementary School
Devonshire Alternative Elementary School
Duxberry Park Alternative Elementary School
Eakin Elementary School
East Columbus Elementary School
East Linden Elementary School
Eastgate Elementary School
Easthaven Elementary School
Ecole Kenwood French Immersion Elementary School
Fairmoor Elementary School
Fairwood Alternative Elementary School
Forest Park Elementary School
Gables Elementary School
Georgian Heights Alternative Elementary School
Hamilton Alternative Elementary School

Highland Elementary School
Hubbard Mastery Elementary School 
Huy Road Elementary School
Indian Springs Elementary School
Innis Elementary School
Leawood Elementary School
Liberty Elementary School
Lincoln Park Elementary School
Lindbergh Elementary School
Linden Elementary School
Livingston Avenue Elementary School
Maize Road Elementary School
Moler Elementary School
North Linden Elementary School
Northtowne Elementary School
Oakland Park Alternative Elementary School
Oakmont Elementary School
Ohio Avenue Elementary School
Olde Orchard Alternative Elementary School
Parkmoor Urban Academy Elementary School
Parsons Elementary School
Salem Elementary School
Scottwood Elementary School
Shady Lane Elementary School
Siebert Elementary School
South Mifflin Elementary School

Southwood Elementary School
Special Education Center

Stewart Alternative Elementary School
Sullivant Elementary School (formerly in Downtown Columbus)
Trevitt Elementary School
Valley Forge Elementary School
Valleyview Elementary School
Watkins Elementary School

Weinland Park Elementary School

West Broad Street Elementary School
West Mound Elementary School
Westgate Alternative Elementary School
Windsor Alternative Elementary School
Winterset Elementary School
Woodcrest Elementary School

Middle schools

Arts Impact Middle School (AIMS)
Buckeye Middle School
Champion Middle School
Columbus City Preparatory School for Boys
Columbus City Preparatory School for Girls
Columbus Gifted Academy (3-8)
Dominion Middle School, formerly site of the Columbus International High School
Hilltonia Middle School
Johnson Park Middle School
Medina Middle School
Mifflin Alternative Middle School
Ridgeview Middle School
Sherwood Middle School
Starling Middle School K-8
Wedgewood Middle School
Westmoor Middle School
Woodward Park Middle School
Yorktown Middle School

K-8 Alternative schools
Africentric K-8
Columbus Spanish Immersion Academy at Beaumont Elementary School
Ecole Kenwood French Immersion School at Kenwood Elementary School
Indianola Informal K-8
Starling PreK-8 School (merger of Dana Elementary and Starling Middle in 2013). Starling Middle School once occupied the original West High School building, at 120 S. Central Avenue.

High schools

Beechcroft High School
Briggs High School
Centennial High School
Columbus Africentric Early College
Columbus Alternative High School
Columbus North International School at Brookhaven
Downtown High School
East High School
Eastmoor Academy
Fort Hayes Metropolitan Education Center
Independence High School
Linden-McKinley High School
Marion-Franklin High School
Mifflin High School
Northland High School
South High School
Walnut Ridge High School
West High School
Whetstone High School

Former schools

Barrett Middle School (1900-2006) - Original South High School building (Named for South's first principal Charles S. Barrett)
Barnett School - closed 1977
Beaumont Elementary School, now Columbus Spanish Immersion Academy
Beck Urban Academy Elementary School, now the South Columbus Preparatory Academy
Bellows Avenue School - closed 1982
Brentnell Alternative Elementary - now the Ohio Dominican University's Charles School
Broadview School
Brookhaven High School - closed May 2014
Calumet School - closed as a Columbus City School, however is now a private Christian school
Central High School (1924-1982) - Current site of COSI. The original Central High School was built in 1862 and located at 303 East Broad Street. It was the first school in Columbus built specifically only as a high school. Its name was changed in 1911 to the High School of Commerce. It closed as a school in 1924, but was used for office space until 1928 when it was demolished. 
Chicago Avenue School
Clarfield Elementary School
Clinton Middle School
Courtright Elementary School
Crestview Middle School - now Indianola Informal K-8 School

Douglas School
Eastwood Elementary School

Everett Middle School - Dennison and Fourth, starting in 1924. It was the original North High School before that. Thereafter, it was home to Arts Impact Middle School for 17 years before Columbus Gifted Academy took over.
Fair Avenue Elementary School
Felton School
Fifth Avenue Public School
First Avenue School
Franklin Alternative Middle School. 1390 Franklin (now Bryden) Road. Formerly Franklin Junior High School, starting in 1923. It was the original East High School before that.
Franklinton Elementary School - Built in 1888 at 666 West Broad Street. It was built on the site of the old Franklin County Courthouse, which had been built in 1809. It was demolished in 1959 to make way for the freeway.
Gladstone School
Glenmont School
Hamilton School
Hudson Elementary School
Indianola Junior High School, later known as Indianola Alternative Elementary School, and the first junior high school in the US.
First building, now Graham Expeditionary Middle School
Second building, now part of Metro Schools
James Road Elementary School 
Kent Elementary School
Kingswood School
Koebel Elementary School
Lane Avenue School
Leonard Avenue School
Linden Park Alternative Elementary - closed 2007
Linmoor Middle School - closed 2007
Main Street Elementary School
Marburn Elementary School
McGuffey Elementary School

Medary Avenue Elementary School - closed 2007
Michigan Avenue School
Milo Public School (1894-1977)
Monroe Traditional Alternative Middle School
Neil Avenue School (Open Air School)
Ninth Avenue School
North High School (1924-1979) - now houses Dominion Middle School
Northridge School
Northwood Avenue School
Pilgrim Elementary School
Pinecrest Elementary School
Reeb Avenue Elementary School
Scioto Trail Elementary School
Sharon School
Stockbridge Elementary School
Third Street School

Twenty-Third Street School
Walford Elementary

2006-2007 Report Card
For the 06-07 school year, the district improved its rating to "Continuous Improvement" on the department of education's rating scale. The district met 42 of 42 adequate yearly progress goals, which allowed the rating to improve.

2021-2022 Report Card
The Ohio Department of Education adopted a new 5-star rating system for the 21-22 Ohio School Report Card system. After a hiatus during the COVID-19 pandemic, school districts received scores for the first time since the 2018-2019 school year. Although Columbus City Schools' "Graduation" ("the four-year adjusted cohort graduation rate and the five-year adjusted cohort graduation rate") and "Early Literacy" ("measure of reading improvement and proficiency for students in kindergarten through third grade") were rated at 1/5 stars, the district's "Progress" ("growth all students are making based on their past performances") and "Gap Closing" ("the reduction in educational gaps for student subgroups") were rated at 3/5 stars. The district also scored 2/5 stars in "Achievement" ("whether student performance on state tests met established thresholds and how well students performed on tests overall"), with all selectable grade level data falling short of those similar districts and the state of Ohio. Looking at "Gap Closing" data, the most growth occurred in English Language Arts.

Statistics
Students: 50,809
Expenditures per student: $13,674

...by gender
	Male: 51.0%	Female: 49.0%
...by ethnicity
	African-American: 58.07% 
Caucasian: 25.58%
Hispanic: 6.74%	Multi-racial: 5.29%
Asian: 2.09%
American Indian/Native Alaskan: 0.2%
...about our students
	Languages spoken at home: 89
Speak English as a second language: 11.5%
Have Limited English Proficiency: 9.5%
Receive district ESL services: 6.4%
Students transported by CCS daily: 32, 140	Identified as Gifted & Talented: 17.7%
Receive Special Education services: 16.06%
Receive a free or reduced-price meal: 68.93%
Student Mobility Rate: 19.7%
Average Daily Attendance: 94.5%

Schools: 118

...by grade level
	Elementary (K-5): 63
STEM Elementary Academies (PreK-6): 4
K-6: 6
K-8 Schools: 4
K-12 Schools (Africentric Early College): 1
Middle Schools (grades 6-8): 18	STEM Academy 7-12 (Linden-McKinley): 1
High School/Middle School 7-12 (South): 1
ESL Welcome Center (grades 6-12): 1
High Schools (grades 9-12): 16
Career Centers: 2
Special Services Schools: 3

Staff: 6,571 (FTE)#

Staff demographics as of June 2011: by gender
	Male: 28.5%	Female: 71.5%
...by ethnicity
	Caucasian: 62.6%
African-American: 35.3% 
Hispanic: 1.2%	Asian: 0.7%
American Indian/Native Alaskan: 0.2%

References

School districts in Ohio
Education in Columbus, Ohio
School districts established in 1845
District boards of education in the United States